James Higgins (14 November 1874 – 24 November 1957) was an Australian cricketer. He played in one first-class match for Queensland in 1898/99.

See also
 List of Queensland first-class cricketers

References

External links
 

1874 births
1957 deaths
Australian cricketers
Queensland cricketers
People from Redland City
Cricketers from Queensland